D'Arcy Boulton (March 29, 1825 – February 16, 1875) was a Canadian lawyer, politician and Orangeman. He was the son of James Boulton and the grandson of G. D'Arcy Boulton.

Life and career
He was born in Perth, Upper Canada, in 1825 and educated at Upper Canada College in Toronto. In 1847, he was admitted to the bar.

In 1864, he became the deputy grandmaster for the Orange Order in British North America; he became the provincial grandmaster for Ontario West in 1870. In 1873, at Glasgow, he became president of the Triennial Orange Conference of the British Empire.

He was elected to the Legislative Assembly of Ontario in a by-election in Simcoe South in 1873. In 1874, he became grandmaster of the Grand Black Chapter of British America, an exclusive Orange order. He died in Toronto in 1875.

References

External links

1825 births
1875 deaths
Progressive Conservative Party of Ontario MPPs
People from Perth, Ontario
Upper Canada College alumni